The Church of All Saints is a Church of England parish church in Elland, Calderdale, West Yorkshire. The church is a grade II* listed building.

History
In 1896, the Church of All Saints was built by George Fellowes Prynne. It is made of hammer-dressed stone and has a tiled roof. It has late Gothic reredos dating from the 1920s, although the carved altar is from the 17th century. Prynne's brother, the leading late Pre-Raphaelite painter Edward Arthur Fellowes Prynne, designed the church's stained glass. On 6 June 1983, the church was designated a grade II* listed building.

Present day
The Church of All Saints is part of the Benefice of "Saint Mary the Virgin, Elland and All Saints, Elland" in the Archdeaconry of Halifax and the Huddersfield Episcopal Area of the Diocese of Leeds.

The parish stands in the Modern Catholic tradition of the Church of England. As All Saints rejects the ordination of women, the church receives alternative episcopal oversight from the Bishop of Wakefield (currently Tony Robinson).

Notable people

 Felix Arnott, later Archbishop of Brisbane, served his curacy in the benefice in the 1930s

See also
Grade II* listed buildings in Calderdale
Listed buildings in Elland

References

External links

 A Church Near You entry

Church of England church buildings in West Yorkshire
Grade II* listed churches in West Yorkshire
Anglo-Catholic church buildings in West Yorkshire
Elland
Elland